The 2023 PDC Players Championship will consist of 30 darts tournaments on the 2023 PDC Pro Tour.

Prize money
The prize money for the Players Championship events will remain at 2022 levels, with each event having a prize fund of £100,000.

This is how the prize money is divided:

February

Players Championship 1
Players Championship 1 was contested on Saturday 11 February 2023 at the Barnsley Metrodome in Barnsley. The winner was Ryan Searle.

Players Championship 2
Players Championship 2 was contested on Sunday 12 February 2023 at the Barnsley Metrodome in Barnsley. The winner was Danny Noppert.

Players Championship 3
Players Championship 3 was contested on Saturday 18 February 2023 at the Barnsley Metrodome in Barnsley. The winner was Kim Huybrechts.

Players Championship 4
Players Championship 4 was contested on Sunday 19 February 2023 at the Barnsley Metrodome in Barnsley. The winner was Dirk van Duijvenbode.

March

Players Championship 5
Players Championship 5 will be contested on Saturday 11 March 2023 at the Barnsley Metrodome in Barnsley.

Players Championship 6
Players Championship 6 will be contested on Sunday 12 March 2023 at the Barnsley Metrodome in Barnsley.

Players Championship 7
Players Championship 7 will be contested on Sunday 19 March 2023 at Halle 39 in Hildesheim.

Players Championship 8
Players Championship 8 will be contested on Monday 20 March 2023 at Halle 39 in Hildesheim.

April

Players Championship 9
Players Championship 9 will be contested on Saturday 15 April 2023 at the Robin Park Tennis Centre in Wigan.

Players Championship 10
Players Championship 10 will be contested on Sunday 16 April 2023 at the Robin Park Tennis Centre in Wigan.

May

Players Championship 11
Players Championship 11 will be contested on Saturday 20 May 2023 at the Morningside Arena in Leicester.

Players Championship 12
Players Championship 12 will be contested on Sunday 21 May 2023 at the Morningside Arena in Leicester.

June

Players Championship 13
Players Championship 13 will be contested on Monday 12 June 2023 at Halle 39 in Hildesheim.

Players Championship 14
Players Championship 14 will be contested on Tuesday 14 June 2023 at Halle 39 in Hildesheim.

July

Players Championship 15
Players Championship 15 will be contested on Monday 10 July 2023 at the Morningside Arena in Leicester.

Players Championship 16
Players Championship 16 will be contested on Tuesday 11 July 2023 at the Morningside Arena in Leicester.

August

Players Championship 17
Players Championship 17 will be contested on Saturday 26 August 2023 at Halle 39 in Hildesheim.

Players Championship 18
Players Championship 18 will be contested on Sunday 27 August 2023 at Halle 39 in Hildesheim.

September

Players Championship 19
Players Championship 19 will be contested on Sunday 3 September 2023 at the Barnsley Metrodome in Barnsley.

Players Championship 20
Players Championship 20 will be contested on Monday 4 September 2023 at the Barnsley Metrodome in Barnsley.

Players Championship 21
Players Championship 21 will be contested on Tuesday 5 September 2023 at the Barnsley Metrodome in Barnsley.

Players Championship 22
Players Championship 22 will be contested on Wednesday 27 September 2023 at the Barnsley Metrodome in Barnsley.

Players Championship 23
Players Championship 23 will be contested on Thursday 28 September 2023 at the Barnsley Metrodome in Barnsley.

Players Championship 24
Players Championship 24 will be contested on Friday 29 September 2023 at the Barnsley Metrodome in Barnsley.

October

Players Championship 25
Players Championship 25 will be contested on Wednesday 18 October 2023 at the Barnsley Metrodome in Barnsley.

Players Championship 26
Players Championship 26 will be contested on Thursday 19 October 2023 at the Barnsley Metrodome in Barnsley.

Players Championship 27
Players Championship 27 will be contested on Friday 20 October 2023 at the Barnsley Metrodome in Barnsley.

Players Championship 28
Players Championship 28 will be contested on Saturday 21 October 2023 at the Barnsley Metrodome in Barnsley.

November

Players Championship 29
Players Championship 29 will be contested on Wednesday 1 November 2023 at the Barnsley Metrodome in Barnsley.

Players Championship 30
Players Championship 30 will be contested on Thursday 2 November 2023 at the Barnsley Metrodome in Barnsley.

References

2023 in darts
2023 PDC Pro Tour
Players Championship Series